Amanullah Khan Jadoon is a Pakistani politician who served as the Federal Minister for Petroleum & Natural Resources from 2002 to 2007.

Political career
Amanullah Khan Jadoon was twice elected as an MPA, (Member of the Provincial Assembly) of Khyber-Pakhtunkhwa. On being elected in 1985, he became the planning and Development minister for Khyber-Pakhtunkhwa and after the 1988 election he served as communication and works minister. In 1993, as part of the Federal Caretaker Cabinet, he served as the Federal Minister for Kashmir Affairs.

In the 2002 elections, he was elected as a Member of the National Assembly (MNA) for his constituency, NA-17: Abbottabad. His constituency is a mix of urban and rural areas as it includes part of Abbottabad city and the adjoining Galiyat mountain valleys. His primary political rival was Mehtab Ahmed Khan in the constituency. On 2 September 2004, he assumed his role as Federal Minister for Petroleum & Natural Resources.

References

External links
Ministry of Petroleum & Natural Resources

Living people
Year of birth missing (living people)
People from Abbottabad